Lanre Fehintola was a British photojournalist. He was a photographer for The Independent from 1989 until 1991. According to Fehintola, his focus has always been "to document the ordinary, everyday, lives of 'real' people whose stories are very seldom told".

Early life 
Fehintola's father was an accountant and his mother ran an old people's home in Bradford. They moved to England when Lanre was two years old, in 1960. He was sent to a children's home at age 11 and at 12 to reform school in Durham. He remained there until he was 15.

He served two prison terms after leaving the reform school, but on the second term

Work
In the late 1980s, Fehintola planned on publishing a book showing the most desperate aspects of Bradford, in Northern England. He captured the lives of prostitutes and criminals, most of them hooked on heroin. Determined to immerse in the lives of his subjects, he felt the need to embed himself into the culture. After experimenting with the drug for his research, he became addicted.

Drug addiction
After using to get closer to his subjects, Fehintola became addicted to heroin. His struggle with heroin addiction was documented in Don't Get High on Your Own Supply (1998), directed by his friend Leo Regan.  In 2000, he published Charlie Says... Don't Get High on Your Own Supply: An Urban Memoir. A year later, Regan directed another TV documentary on Fehintola, Cold Turkey (2001), as he tries to go cold turkey in his flat, without medication.

Fehintola died on 18 February 2021 in Taunton, Somerset, UK. He had been working on a long-term project with friend and filmmaker Leo Regan to complete the trilogy they began in 1998. Delivering a eulogy at Fehintola's funeral Regan said:

References 

British photojournalists
Living people
Photographers from Yorkshire
1958 births